The Kenya national handball team is the national handball team of Kenya and is governed by the Kenya Handball Federation.

Results

African Championship
2004 – 9th
2016 – 12th
2020 – 15th
2022 – Withdrawn

All-Africa Games
1987 – 5th
2011 – 10th
2015 – 10th

Current squad
'''Squad to 2016 African Men's Handball Championship.

 Victor Siero (C)
 Rodgers Ambudo
 Kevin Koga
 Bruno Sewe
 Tyrus Ochieng
 Cheruiyot Kiplagat
 Paul Nyambuke
 Celestus Okoyana
 Thodosia Sangoro
 Davis Omondi
 Victor Otuoma
 Byron Agunda
 Austin Oduor
 Bryan Oduor
 Rashid Ingutsa

References

External links
IHF profile

Kenya
Handball